Cleo, Camping, Emmanuelle and Dick is a 1998 play written by the English dramatist Terry Johnson, who also directed the original production at the National Theatre.

The play is about the off-screen love affair between Carry On film stalwarts, Barbara Windsor and Sid James.

The comedy also portrays the filming of the "Carry On" series as a less than glamorous affair, characterised by leaking caravans, inadequate pay and argumentative co-stars.

Most of the play's action takes place on rain-soaked locations with a scantily-clad Barbara taking refuge in Sid's trailer while he and co-star Kenneth Williams carry on their notorious feud, which began when they starred together in the TV series Hancock's Half Hour.

In 2000, Johnson adapted the play for television as Cor, Blimey!.

Characters
Sid James
Barbara Windsor
Kenneth Williams
Imogen Hassall
Sally (Sid's dresser)
Eddie (A driver and bodyguard supposedly employed by Barbara's husband, Ronnie Knight)

Original cast
The cast of the original National Theatre production were:
Geoffrey Hutchings (Sid)
Samantha Spiro (Barbara)
Adam Godley (Kenneth)
Gina Bellman (Imogen)
Jacqueline Defferary (Sally)
Kenneth MacDonald (Eddie)

References

Further reading
 

1998 plays
Comedy plays
Laurence Olivier Award-winning plays
Plays by Terry Johnson
West End plays